This is a list of art schools in Europe, containing art schools below higher (tertiary) undergraduate education. The list makes no distinction between public or private institutions, or by institutions that focus solely on fine art or as part of a wider range of related or non-related subjects. However, it does exclude (1) institutions of (tertiary) higher education (instead listed in List of art universities and colleges in Europe), and (2) institutions that focus solely on arts in the definition of design or applied arts, etc.

Austria
Academy of Fine Arts Vienna
Anton Bruckner Private University, Linz
Mozarteum University Salzburg
University of Applied Arts Vienna
University of Art and Design Linz
University of Music and Performing Arts Graz
University of Music and Performing Arts Vienna

Belgium

French community of Belgium

Brussels 

 École nationale supérieure des arts visuels de La Cambre (ENSAV La Cambre)
 Académie royale des Beaux-Arts – École supérieure des Arts de la Ville de Bruxelles (ARBA-ESA)
 Instituts Saint-Luc de Bruxelles:
 École supérieure des Arts Saint-Luc (ESA)
 École de recherche graphique (Erg)
 Institut national supérieur des arts du spectacle et des techniques de diffusion (INSAS)
 École supérieure des Arts du Cirque (ESAC)
 Royal Conservatory of Brussels (CRB)
 École supérieure des Arts de l'image Le 75 (ESA Le 75)

Liège 

 École supérieure des arts de la ville de Liège (ÉSAVL)
 Royal Conservatory of Liège (CRL)

Louvain-la-Neuve 

  (IAD)

Mons

Flemish community of Belgium 

 Erasmushogeschool Brussel (EhB):
  (RITCS)
 Royal Conservatory of Brussels (KCB)
 LUCA School of Arts:
 Lemmensinstituut
  (AP):
 Royal Academy of Fine Arts Antwerp
 Royal Conservatoire of Antwerp
 Hogeschool Gent (HoGent):
 Royal Academy of Fine Arts (KASK)

Private unrecognized institutions 

 Institut Jaques-Dalcroze
 École supérieure de réalisation audiovisuelle
 Queen Elisabeth Music Chapel

Estonia 
 Estonian Academy of Arts (Eesti Kunstiakadeemia)

Finland
University of the Arts, Helsinki
Free Art School, Helsinki
Nordic Art School, Kokkola

France

École nationale supérieure des Beaux-Arts de Paris (ENSBA)
École supérieure d'art de Lorraine (ESAL)
École nationale supérieure des arts décoratifs (ENSAD)
École nationale supérieure d'arts de Paris-Cergy (ENSAPC)
École nationale supérieure des beaux-arts de Lyon
Haute école des arts du Rhin (HEAR)

Defunct
Académie Julian, Paris (See also: List of faculty and alumni of the Académie Julian)
Académie Colarossi
Académie Ranson
Écoles gratuites de dessin

Greece
Athens School of Fine Arts
University of West Attica, Athens, School of Applied Arts and Culture
Aristotle University of Thessaloniki, Faculty of Fine Arts
Aegean Center for the Fine Arts, Paros Fine Arts School
Arts and Arts Sciences, University of Ioannina
School of Fine Arts Tinos, Marble Workshop
Hellenic Open University, Patras School of Applied Arts
Ionian University of Corfu, Department of Audio-Visual Arts
Dept of Wood & Furniture Design and Technology, Karditsa TEI of Thessaly
University of the Aegean, Syros, Department of product and systems design

Hungary
Faculty of Music and Visual Arts, Pécs
Hungarian University of Fine Arts
Moholy-Nagy University of Art and Design Budapest
Budapest Metropolitan University

Ireland
Burren College of Art, Galway
Crawford College of Art and Design, Cork
Dublin Institute of Technology
Dún Laoghaire Institute of Art, Design and Technology
Galway-Mayo Institute of Technology, Department of Art and Design/Film and Television, Galway
Limerick School of Art and Design
National College of Art and Design, Dublin
Waterford Institute of Technology, Department of Art, Waterford

Italy

 Accademia di belle arti Michelangelo, Agrigento (1979)
 Accademia di Belle Arti di Bari, Bari (1970)
 Accademia Carrara di Belle Arti di Bergamo, Bergamo (1796)
 Accademia di Belle Arti di Bologna, Bologna (1802)
 Free University of Bozen-Bolzano, Bolzano (1997)
 Libera Accademia di Belle Arti LABA di Brescia, Brescia (1999)
 , Brescia (2002)
 Accademia di Belle Arti di Carrara, Carrara (1769)
 Accademia di Belle Arti di Catania, Catania (1967) 
 Accademia di Belle Arti di Catanzaro, Catanzaro (1972)
 Accademia di Belle Arti Aldo Galli di Como, Como (1989)
 , Cuneo (1992)
 , Faenza (1980)
 Accademia di Belle Arti di Firenze, Florence (1563)
 Florence Classical Arts Academy, Florence (2009)
 Istituto Europeo di Design, Florence
 Istituto Superiore per le Industrie Artistiche ISIA Firenze, Florence (1975)
 Accademia Italiana, Florence – Rome
 Florence Art Studio, Florence
 Accademia di Belle Arti di Foggia, Foggia (1970)
 Accademia di Belle Arti di San Pietroburgo a Firenze, Florence (2017)
 Accademia di Belle Arti di Frosinone, Frosinone (1973)
 Accademia Ligustica di Belle Arti di Genova, Genoa (1751)
 Accademia di Belle Arti di L'Aquila, L'Aquila (1969)
 Accademia di Belle Arti di Lecce, Lecce (1960)
 Accademia di Belle Arti di Macerata, Macerata (1972)
 Accademia di Belle Arti di Milano "Brera", Milan (1776)
 Nuova Accademia di Belle Arti, Milan (1980)
 , Milan
 Istituto Europeo di Design, Milan
 Scuola Politecnica di Design, Milan (1954)
 Domus Academy, Milan (1982)
 Accademia di Belle Arti di Napoli, Naples (1752)
 Accademia di Belle Arti Europea dei Media ACME di Novara, Novara
 Accademia di Belle Arti di Palermo, Palermo (1780)
 Accademia di Belle Arti di Perugia, Perugia (1573)
 Accademia di Belle Arti di Ravenna, Ravenna (1827)
 Accademia di Belle Arti di Reggio Calabria, Reggio Calabria (1967)
 Accademia di Belle Arti di Roma, Rome (latter part of the 16th century)
 Accademia di Belle Arti "Rome University of Fine Arts" di Roma, Rome (1998)
 Istituto Superiore per le Industrie Artistiche ISIA Roma, Rome (1962)
 Accademia di Belle Arti Abadir di San Martino delle Scale, San Martino delle Scale
 Accademia di Belle Arti di Sanremo, Sanremo (1997)
 Accademia di Belle Arti Abadir di Sant'Agata li Battiati, Sant'Agata li Battiati
 Accademia di Belle Arti di Sassari, Sassari (1989)
 Accademia di Belle Arti "Fidia" di Stefanaconi, Stefanaconi (1997)
 , Syracuse (1995)
 Accademia di Belle Arti Kandinskij di Trapani, Trapani (1999)
 Accademia di Belle Arti di Torino "Albertina", Turin (1678)
 , Turin (1978)
 Accademia di Belle Arti di Urbino, Urbino (1967)
 , Urbino (1974)
 Accademia di Belle Arti di Venezia, Venice (1750)
 Università Iuav di Venezia, Venice – Treviso (1926)
 Accademia di Belle Arti di Verona, Verona (1764)
 Accademia di Belle Arti "Lorenzo da Viterbo", Viterbo (1975)

Latvia
 Art Academy of Latvia, Riga
 Jānis Rozentāls Art High School, Riga
 Liepājas Art Highschool
 Mara Muizniece Riga School of Art, Riga
 Pardaugava Music and Art School, Riga
 Riga Design and Art school, Riga
 Riga School of Arts and Crafts, Riga
 Saldus Art school
 Valka Art school (also provides primary art education to Estonian schoolchildren from Valga)
 Valmiera Design and Art school, Valmiera
 Rezekne Art and Design school, Rezekne

Lithuania
 Jonava Janina Miščiukaitė School of Art, Jonava
 National M. K. Čiurlionis School of Art, Vilnius
 Vilnius Academy of Art

Netherlands
Academie Minerva, Groningen
AKI Academy for Art & Design, Enschede; part of ArtEZ University of Arts
AKV St. Joost, 's-Hertogenbosch and Breda
Amsterdam University of the Arts
ArtEZ University of Arts, Arnhem en Zwolle
, Zwolle
Design Academy Eindhoven
, Tilburg
Gerrit Rietveld Academie, Amsterdam
Interdisciplinary Arts Maastricht (iArts), Maastricht
Jan Van Eyck Academie, Maastricht
Maastricht Academy of Fine Arts
Rijksakademie van beeldende kunsten, Amsterdam
Royal Academy of Art, The Hague
Utrecht School of the Arts
Willem de Kooning Academy (WDKA), Rotterdam

Norway
Tromsø Academy of Contemporary Art, Tromsø
Oslo National Academy of the Arts, Oslo
Fakultet for kunst, musikk og design, UiB, Bergen
Kunstakademiet, Trondheim
Einar Granum Kunstfagskole, Oslo
Strykejernet, Oslo
Designinstituttet, Oslo
Prosjektskolen art school, Oslo

Poland
Academy of Arts, Warsaw
Academy of Fine Arts Eugeniusza Gepperta, Wrocław
Academy of Fine Arts in Gdańsk
Academy of Fine Arts in Katowice
University of Fine Arts in Poznań
Academy of Fine Arts in Warsaw
Jan Matejko Academy of Fine Arts, Kraków
Academy of Fine Arts In Łódź
Academy of Music in Kraków
Aleksander Zelwerowicz National Academy of Dramatic Art in Warsaw
Fryderyk Chopin University of Music, Warsaw
AST National Academy of Theatre Arts in Kraków, Kraków
National Film School in Łódź

Arts faculties of other universities in Poland: 
Art Department at the Maria Curie-Skłodowska University in Lublin
Art Department of Silesian University in Cieszyn
Art Department, University of Zielona Góra
Faculty of Arts, Pedagogical University of Kraków
Faculty of Arts, University of Rzeszów
Faculty of Arts, Kazimierz Pułaski University of Technology and Humanities in Radom
Faculty of Fine Arts, Nicolaus Copernicus University in Toruń
Faculty of Pedagogy and Art, Adam Mickiewicz University in Kalisz
Faculty of Arts, University of Warmia and Mazury in Olsztyn
Faculty of Pedagogy and Art, Jan Kochanowski University in Kielce

Private universities:
European Academy of Arts in Warsaw
Polish–Japanese Institute of Information Technology, Faculty of New Media Arts in Warsaw and Gdańsk and design course in Bytom

Art schools:
Kraków Schools of Art and Fashion Design in Kraków

Portugal
Escola Superior de Tecnologia e Gestão, Instituto Politécnico de Portalegre, Portalegre
Escola Secundária Artística António Arroio, Lisboa
Escola Superior de Música de Lisboa, Instituto Politécnico de Lisboa, Lisboa
Departamento de Comunicação e Arte, Universidade de Aveiro, Aveiro
VICARTE, Research Unit "Glass and Ceramic for the Arts", Master of Glass Art and Science, Faculdade de Ciências e Tecnologia da Universidade Nova de Lisboa
Departamento de Artes Visuais / Escola das Artes / Universidade de Évora, Évora
ESAD Matosinhos – Escola Superior de Artes e Design, Matosinhos, Porto
ESAP – Escola Superior Artística do Porto, Porto
ESAD.CR – Escola Superior de Artes e Design, Caldas da Rainha
IADE – Instituto de Artes Visuais, Design e Marketing, Lisboa
Escola Superior Artística do Porto, Porto
FBAUP, Faculdade de Belas Artes da Universidade do Porto, Porto
FBAUL, Faculdade de Belas Artes da Universidade de Lisboa, Lisboa
ESART. Escola Superior de Artes  de Castelo Branco
Colégio das Artes, Universidade de Coimbra, Coimbra

Romania
George Enescu National University of Arts, Iași
West University of Timișoara, Facultatea de Arte si Design, Timişoara
Art and Design University of Cluj-Napoca
Bucharest National University of Arts
University of Oradea, Facultatea de Arte vizuale, Oradea

Russia
Moscow State University of Printing Arts, Moscow
College of Printing Arts, Moscow
MArchI, Moscow
Imperial Academy of Arts, St. Petersburg
Saint Petersburg Art and Industry Academy, St.Petersburg
British Higher School of Art and Design, Moscow

Serbia
University of Arts in Belgrade, Belgrade
Faculty of Fine Arts, Belgrade
Faculty of Applied Arts, Belgrade
Academy of Arts, University of Novi Sad, Novi Sad
Academy of Classical Painting, Educons University, Sremska Kamenica
School of Applied Arts, Šabac
College of Fine and Applied Arts, Belgrade

Slovakia
Academy of Arts in Banská Bystrica
Academy of Fine Arts and Design, Bratislava (VSVU – abbreviation in Slovak), Bratislava
Academy of Performing Arts in Bratislava (VSMU), Bratislava
Josef Vydra School of Applied Arts (SUV), Bratislava

Spain
ANIMUM Creativity Advanced School, Málaga.
AULA CM, School of Marketing and Communication. Madrid
Barcelona Academy of Art (BAA. -abbrev. in Spanish Lang), Barcelona 
Barcelona Atelier of Realist Art (BARA. -abbrev. in Spanish Lang), Barcelona
Escola d'Art i Superior de Disseny d'Alacant (EASD.A – abbrev. in Spanish lang.), Alicante
Escuela Superior de Arte del Principado de Asturias (ESAPA – abbrev. in Spanish lang.), Asturias
Escola d'Art i Superior de Disseny Pau Gargallo (EASD – abbrev. in Spanish lang.), Badalona, Barcelona
Escola Massana, Centre d'Art i Disseny, Barcelona
Elisava, Escola Superior de Disseny, Barcelona
Esdi, Escola Superior de Disseny, Sabadell, Barcelona
Eina, Escola de Disseny i Art, Barcelona
Davinci Escola d'Art, Barcelona
Estudio Nómada, Barcelona
Istituto Europeo di Design (IED), Barcelona
FDModa, Escuela Superior de Diseño y Moda Felicidad Duce, Barcelona
IDEP, Escuela Superior Universitaria de imagen y diseño, Barcelona
 Metàfora, International Workshop, Barcelona
Davinci Escola d'Art, Barcelona
Barcelona Academy of Art (BAA), Barcelona
EASD de Vic, Vic (Barcelona)
UCLM Universidad de Castilla-La Mancha, Cuenca
Escola d'Art i Superior de Disseny d'Olot, Girona
Escuela de Arte Granada, Granada
Escuela de Arte número diez, Madrid
E/S/D MADRID, Escuela Superior del Diseño
UCM Universidad Complutense de Madrid, Madrid
Escuela Trazos, Madrid
CICE, Escuela Profesional de Nuevas Tecnologias, Madrid
ESNE, School Of Design, Madrid
Instituto Superior de Arte, Madrid
Real Escuela Superior de Dramatico, Madrid
Istituto Europeo di Design (IED), Madrid
ESDIP, Escuela Superior de Dibujo Profesional, Madrid
 Escuela Superior de Artes y Espectáculos, TAI, Madrid
Academia del Lusso, Madrid
Escuela de Arte Collado Mediano (EACM), Madrid
Escuela de Arte de Murcia, Murcia
Escola de Arte e Superior de Deseño Antonio Failde, Ourense
Escola de Arte e Superior de Deseño Mestre Mateo, Santiago de Compostela
Escuela de Artes de Zaragoza, Zaragoza
PHotoEspaña International Centre Alcobendas PIC.A, Alcobendas-Madrid
 Creanavarra centro superior de diseño, Pamplona, Navarra
 Institute of the Arts Barcelona

Sweden
Idun Lovén Art School, Stockholm, 1920
Swedish Academy of Realist Art, 2006
Pernby School of Painting, Stockholm, 1929
Gerlesborg School of Fine Art, Gerlesborg and Stockholm, 1944
Konstfack, Stockholm, 1844
Royal Institute of Art, Stockholm, 1735

Switzerland
École cantonale d'art de Lausanne
Haute Ecole d'Art et Design de Genève (HEAD)
Hochschule der Künste Bern (HKB)
Institut Kunst Hochschule für Gestaltung und Kunst Basel (HGK)
Zurich University of the Arts (ZHDK)
F+F Schule für Kunst und Mediendesign Zürich (FFZH)
Hochschule Luzern Kunst & Design
Centre d'Enseignement Professionnel de Vevey (CEPV)
École cantonale d'art du Valais (ECAV)

Turkey
Mimar Sinan Fine Arts University

United Kingdom

England
Fine Arts College
Heatherley School of Fine Art
Manchester School of Art
Open College of the Arts
Putney School of Art and Design
Royal Drawing School
School of Art, Architecture and Design (London Metropolitan University)

Scotland
Duncan of Jordanstone College of Art and Design, Dundee
Edinburgh Atelier of Fine Art
Edinburgh College of Art, University of Edinburgh
Glasgow School of Art, Glasgow
Gray's School of Art, The Robert Gordon University, Aberdeen
Leith School of Art, Edinburgh

Wales
Aberystwyth University School of Art
Arts Academy Cardiff
Cardiff School of Art & Design
North Wales School of Art & Design, Wrexham
Swansea College of Art

See also
Art school
Art education
List of art universities and colleges in Europe

References 

Europe
Europe-related lists